Rex Brian Reynolds is an American politician who is currently serving in the Alabama House of Representatives. He is a member of the Republican Party.

References

21st-century American politicians
1959 births
Living people
Alabama Republicans